Pedaspää is a village in Räpina Parish, Põlva County in Estonia.

References

Villages in Põlva County